Patricia Josephine Reid (born 2 March 1964) is a retired British rower who competed for Great Britain at the 1992 Summer Olympics.

Rowing career
Reid began rowing in 1984 for the Somerville College, Oxford second eight before progressing to Osiris (the Oxford University second eight) and the Somerville first eight. She was part of the coxed four with Alison Bonner, Sarah Hunter-Jones, Ann Callaway and Lesley Clare (cox), that won the national title rowing for A.R.A squad, at the 1985 National Championships and subsequently went to her first World Championships in Belgium.

In 1986 she was the OUWBC President and rowed in the Oxford first eight and represented England winning a silver medal in the eight and a bronze medal in the coxed four, at the 1986 Commonwealth Games in Edinburgh, Scotland. She was a member of the eight that won the national title rowing for a A.R.A squad at the 1987 National Championships. She won the single sculls national title at the 1990 National Championships.

Reid competed in the women's single sculls event at the 1992 Summer Olympics, finishing in ninth place. She won another single sculls title at the 1995 National Championships.

Reid also represented Great Britain at three more World Championships (1986, 1987 and 1990).

Personal life
She studied at Somerville College, Oxford.

References

External links
 

1964 births
Living people
British female rowers
Olympic rowers of Great Britain
Rowers at the 1992 Summer Olympics
Rowers from Greater London
Alumni of Somerville College, Oxford
Commonwealth Games medallists in rowing
Commonwealth Games silver medallists for England
Commonwealth Games bronze medallists for England
Rowers at the 1986 Commonwealth Games
Medallists at the 1986 Commonwealth Games